Ricardo López (January 14, 1975 – September 12, 1996), also known as the "Björk stalker", was an American pest exterminator who attempted to murder the Icelandic singer Björk.

López was born in Uruguay and moved to Lawrenceville, Georgia with his family, and began working as an exterminator. He had poor self-esteem, was socially reclusive, and he eventually developed an obsession with Björk in 1993, hoping to be engaged with her; he was particularly angry over her brief relationship with the English musician Goldie. Over the course of nearly nine months in 1996, he made video diaries about her and other topics at his apartment in Hollywood, Florida.

On September 12, 1996, López mailed a letter bomb rigged with sulfuric acid to Björk's residence in London, then returned home, recorded a final video diary explaining his motivations, and ended it filming his suicide by gunshot. Hollywood police found his body and the videos four days after his death; they contacted the Metropolitan Police about the package, who intercepted its delivery, and Björk was unharmed.

Early life 
Ricardo López was born in Uruguay on January 14, 1975, into a middle-class family who moved to the United States and settled in Lawrenceville, Georgia. He had a good relationship with his family, and was described as easygoing but introverted. He had a few male friends, but never made female friends, nor had a girlfriend, because he had feelings of inadequacy and had social awkwardness around women. López had Klinefelter syndrome.

With aspirations to become a famous artist, López dropped out of high school. However, he did not seriously pursue an artistic career due to his feelings of inferiority, and fear of being rejected entry into art school. He intermittently worked for his brother's pest control business to support himself. By the age of 17, López had become reclusive and, as a means of escape, retreated into a world of fantasies and became enthralled by celebrities.

Obsession with Björk 

In 1993, López became fixated on the Icelandic singer Björk. He began gathering information about her life, followed her career, and wrote her numerous fan letters. Initially, López cited her as his muse and said that his infatuation gave him a "euphoric feeling". As time passed, his fixation became all-consuming and he grew more disconnected from reality. In his diary, López wrote of longing to be accepted by Björk and to be a person who had "an effect on her life". He fantasized about inventing a time machine to travel to the 1970s and befriending her as a child. His fantasies about Björk were not sexual; in his diary, he wrote, "I couldn't have sex with Björk because I love her."

López's diary grew to 803 pages, with passages about his thoughts on Björk and his feelings of inadequacy due to being overweight, his disgust and embarrassment about his gynecomastia, and his inability to get a girlfriend. He wrote that he considered himself "a loser who never even learned to drive" and complained about his menial job as an exterminator that earned little money.  The diary contained 168 references to López's feelings of failure, 34 references to suicide, and 14 references to murder. He made 408 references to Björk and 52 references to other celebrities.

Letter bomb plot 
In 1996, López was living alone in an apartment in Hollywood, Florida. Around this time he read in Entertainment Weekly that Björk was in a romantic relationship with the English musician Goldie. López was angered by this perceived betrayal and the fact that she was involved with a black man, writing in his diary: "I wasted eight months and she has a fucking lover." He began fantasizing about how he could "punish" Björk.

López stopped writing his diary and began filming a video diary in his apartment. According to López, the diary's purpose was to document "my life, my art and my plan. Comfort is what I seek in speaking to you ... I am being my own psychologist. You are a camera. I am Ricardo." He recorded eleven video tapes containing approximately two hours of footage each. The tapes contain footage of López preparing his "revenge" and discussing his "crush [that] ended up as an obsession". López's anger over Björk's relationship with Goldie intensified and he decided to kill her. In one entry, he said: "I'm just going to have to kill her. I'm going to send a package. I'm going to be sending her to hell."

López initially intended to construct a bomb filled with hypodermic needles containing HIV-tainted blood, which satisfied his desire to have a lasting effect on Björk's life. When he realized it would not be feasible to build such a device, López began constructing a letter bomb using sulfuric acid in a hollowed-out book, which he planned to have sent to Björk's home in London, England. The device was designed to explode and kill or disfigure Björk as she opened the book. He would commit suicide after mailing the bomb, hoping that he and Björk would be united in heaven.

Death 
On the morning of September 12, 1996, López began filming his final video diary entry. The final tape, titled "Last Day – Ricardo López", begins with López preparing to go to the post office to mail the letter bomb. He said that he was "very, very nervous", but that he would kill himself rather than be arrested if he aroused suspicion. After returning from the post office, he resumed filming. As Björk's music plays in the background, a naked López shaves his head and eyebrows and paints his face red and green. He examines himself in a mirror and tells the camera that he is "a little nervous now". He then states, "I'm definitely not drunk. I am not depressed. I know exactly what I am doing. [The gun] is cocked back. It's ready to roll." He groans and his body falls out of view; shortly after he begins to bleed out on the floor, which is audible. At this point, the camera then stopped filming. A hand-painted sign bearing the handwritten words "The best of me. Sept. 12" hung on the wall behind him. Police theorized that López intended to cover the sign with his blood and brain matter with the gunshot.

On September 16, a foul odor and blood were noticed coming from López's apartment. The Hollywood Police Department entered and discovered López's decomposing corpse. Written on the wall was a message: "The 8mm videos are documentation of a crime, terrorist matter, they are for the FBI." The Broward County Sheriff's Office evacuated the building while the bomb squad searched for further explosives, and found none. After viewing López's final tape, police contacted Scotland Yard to warn them that the potentially explosive package was en route to Björk's residence in London. The package had yet to be delivered; the Metropolitan Police intercepted it from a south London post office and it was safely detonated. There had been little danger of Björk receiving the bomb, as her mail was vetted through her management's office. Unbeknownst to López, Björk and Goldie had ended their relationship a few days before he killed himself.

Aftermath 
Björk said in a statement that she was distressed by the incident. She described it as "terrible" and "very sad", and said that people should not "take me too literally and get involved in my personal life". She sent a card and flowers to López's family. She left for Spain, where she recorded the remainder of her third album, Homogenic, away from media attention. She also hired security for her son, Sindri, who was escorted to school with a minder. A year after López's death, Björk discussed the incident in an interview: "I was very upset that somebody had died. I couldn't sleep for a week. And I'd be lying if I said it didn't scare the fuck out of me. That I could get hurt and, most of all, that my son could get hurt."

López's family and friends were aware of his obsession with Björk. They maintained that they had no idea that he harbored violent thoughts or was capable of violence. At one point, his brother had told him to "get a real woman, you're obsessed". A psychiatrist who treated López for anxiety shortly before his death also stated that he did not appear dangerous. López's videotapes, including his suicide, were confiscated by the FBI and released to journalists.

In popular culture 
 
In 2000, Sami Saif released a 70-minute documentary, The Video Diary of Ricardo López, comprising a condensed version of López's 22-hour video diary. Saif decided to limit its availability as "I want to be there when people see the film, because there are all sorts of things about Ricardo López on the internet. I like to be able to talk to people about what it is they've actually seen."

In 2019, independent Italian director Domiziano Cristopharo released an 87-minute erotic horror film titled The Obsessed, with the working title of Last Day: The Best of Me. López's video diary was adapted as the subject material of The Obsessed in what Cristopharo described as "Albania's first horror film" and "a body horror freely inspired to the real story of Ricardo López, Bjork’s stalker." The film included the appearance of a mouthed penis with a tongue and teeth.

In 2022, López's letter bomb plot was referenced by the Adult Swim animated television series Smiling Friends in the episode "Enchanted Forest". Main characters Pim and Charlie agreed to help a hobbit-esque forest dweller named Mip deliver a handmade gift to the Princess of the Enchanted Forest, who they've been tasked to make smile again for a portrait. After reaching the castle following the accidental death of Mip, it is discovered that the Princess had been unable to smile as Mip had been stalking her, and the gift was in fact a bomb meant to kill the Princess. Previously in 2015, the Björk stalker was a topic of discussion on SleepyCast, a podcast involving Smiling Friends co-creator and voice actor Zach Hadel.

References

External links 
 

1975 births
1996 suicides
American failed assassins
Criminals from Florida
Filmed deaths in the United States
Filmed suicides
People from Hollywood, Florida
Stalking
Suicides by firearm in Florida
Uruguayan criminals
Uruguayan emigrants to the United States
Intersex men